Oliver Frederick Bridewell, 10 December 1985 – 20 July 2007), from Etchilhampton, Wiltshire, was a British motorcycle road racer.

In 2005, he competed in the British Superstock Championship, as well as a European series one-off at Brands Hatch.

In 2006 and 2007, he raced in the British Superbike Championship for Vivaldi Suzuki, alongside his brother Tommy in 2007. His best results were two 8th places.

Bridewell died during practice at Mallory Park on 20 July 2007. Torrential rain had made the circuit slippery, and he lost control entering the John Cooper Esses and crashed, suffering head and neck injuries. As with all UK Motorsport events an ambulance was at the scene and tended to him, but without success and he was pronounced dead at the circuit.

Air Ambulance Volunteer Doctor Dhushy Kumar reported that "Unfortunately, Mr Bridewell was in cardiac arrest when we arrived". Michael Rutter described him as a "highly talented and a very popular young lad".

Around 1300 people gathered for the funeral at St Mary's Church, Bishops Cannings on 1 August 2007, followed by a private family burial at Etchilhampton Churchyard.

References

External links
 BBC Sport
 Thisiswiltshire.co.uk

1985 births
2007 deaths
People from Wiltshire
English motorcycle racers
Motorcycle racers who died while racing
British Superbike Championship riders
FIM Superstock 1000 Cup riders
Sport deaths in England